Belowla Island is an island in Australia. It is located in the state of New South Wales, in the southeastern part of the country, 160 km east of the capital, Canberra.

References

Islands of New South Wales